A Bismarck tower is a specific type of monument built according to a more or less standard model across Germany to honour its first chancellor, Otto von Bismarck (d. 1898). A total of 234 of these towers were inventoried by Kloss and Seele in 2007 but more have been discovered since making the total around 240. These towers were built between 1869 and 1934 and some 173 remain today.  Quite a few of these towers, including all 47 based on Wilhelm Kreis's Götterdämmerung design, were built as so-called Bismarck Columns (Bismarcksäulen) or were converted into them. This description goes back to the Student Union's competition held in 1899, which was to encourage the erection of as many beacons as possible (and not observation towers). But other Bismarck towers, e.g., those that were purely beacons with no observation function, were often called Bismarck columns.

History
The world's first Bismarck tower now stands in Poland. It was erected by private initiative in 1869 in the village of Ober-Johnsdorf, Silesia, then part of Prussia (now Janówek, Poland). It stands on top of the hill now called Jańska Góra, 253 m above sea level. The tower itself is 23 m in height.  The sponsor was a retired Prussian officer Friedrich Schröter (1820–1888), a wealthy landowner in nearby Wättrisch.

One year after Bismarck's death, German Studentenverbindung fraternities chose one of the designs submitted by the architect Wilhelm Kreis in an 1899 architecture competition. The award-winning Götterdämmerung fire column design of granite or sandstone was selected as a standard model for all Bismarck towers. The massive and squat design could be built to different heights and widths depending on the amount of money donated for the particular monument.

In manifestation of the Bismarck cult, they were built in various styles in locations across the German Empire, including its colonies in New Guinea (Gazelle Peninsula), Cameroon (near Limbe) and Tanzania, as well as in areas of Europe that, at the time, were part of Germany, but now lie within the borders of Poland, France, Denmark or Russia. Bismarck towers were also built in Austria, in the Czech Republic, and in Concepción, Chile.

Every Bismarck tower was intended as a beacon, with their braziers lit on specified days in honour of the former chancellor to commemorate his achievement in unifying Germany in 1871. Though most towers included firing installations, plans for a nationwide beaconing failed, and many local initiatives chose deviating designs. The architects of these towers included Wilhelm Kreis himself, who built 58 (47 to the Götterdämmerung design), and Bruno Schmitz.

Bismarck towers (selection) 
 Aachen, finished in 1907
 Bad Kissingen, 1930
 Ballenstedt, 1930/31
 Burg (Spreewald), completed 1917
 Bydgoszcz, Poland, blown up in 1928
 Freiburg im Breisgau, completed 1900
 Hanover, finished in 1904, dismantled in 1935
 Heidelberg, finished in 1903
 Janówek (Ober-Johnsdorf), Poland - the first Bismarck tower, finished in 1869
 Kallstadt
 Metz, Le Ban-Saint-Martin - the only preserved Bismarck tower in France
 Porta Westfalica, 1902, dismantled in 1952
 Salzgitter, 1900
 Szczecin (Stettin), Poland
 Viersen, 1901
 Wiesbaden, 1910 - with  the highest tower, dismantled in 1918
 Zielona Góra (Grünberg), Poland
 Three Emperors' Corner,  finished in 1907, dismantled in 1933 -  at the confluence of the Black and White Przemsza rivers in the present-day Silesian Voivodeship of Poland. Until 1918, it marked the place at which the borders of three empires that had divided Poland – the Russian Empire, Austria-Hungary and the German Empire – met.

References

External links

 Bismarck towers' official website 
 FAQ about Bismarck towers 
 360° pano 2017 Bismarck Tower near Chernyakhoivsk (Gumbinen)
 Photorgammetry 3D scan on sketchfab 2017 Bismarck Tower near Chernyakhoivsk (Gumbinen)

 
Monuments to Otto von Bismarck
Towers